Buenos Aires is a corregimiento in Chame District, Panamá Oeste Province, Panama with a population of 2,030 as of 2010. Its population as of 1990 was 1,435; its population as of 2000 was 1,615.

References

Corregimientos of Panamá Oeste Province